Dave Pike Plays the Jazz Version of Oliver! is an album by American jazz vibraphonist Dave Pike performing compositions by Lionel Bart from the musical Oliver! which was recorded in 1962 for the Moodsville label.

Reception

AllMusic awarded the album 2 stars.

Track listing
All compositions by Lionel Bart
 "I'd Do Anything" - 4:45
 "As Long as He Needs Me" - 5:37
 "Who Will Buy" - 6:09
 "Food, Glorious Food" - 3:18
 "Boy for Sale" - 1:18
 "Where Is Love?" - 5:48
 "It's a Fine Life" - 4:46

Personnel 
Dave Pike - vibraphone
Tommy Flanagan - piano
Jimmy Raney - guitar
George Tucker - bass
Walter Perkins - drums

References 

1963 albums
Dave Pike albums
Prestige Records albums
Albums recorded at Van Gelder Studio
Albums produced by Don Schlitten